Patrice Dominguez (12 January 1950 – 12 April 2015) was a French tennis player born in Algeria. He reached a career high ranking of No. 36 in 1973. He represented France in the Davis Cup between 1971 and 1979.

Dominguez was runner–up at the 1973 French Open mixed doubles event partnering Betty Stöve and again in 1978 partnering Virginia Ruzici.

He then became a trainer for several players such as Henri Leconte and Fabrice Santoro. He also worked as an analyst for different French media.

Between 2005 and 2011 he was the national technical director of the French Tennis Federation.

Dominguez died on 12 April 2015 from a chronic illness at the age of 65.

Grand Slam finals

Mixed doubles (2 runners-up)

Career finals

Doubles (6 titles, 1 runner-up)

References

External links
 
 
 

1950 births
2015 deaths
French male tennis players
French people of Spanish descent
Sportspeople from Algiers
Pieds-Noirs